The 1906 Victorian Football Association season was the 30th season of the Australian rules football competition. The premiership was won by the West Melbourne Football Club, after defeating  in the close final by eleven points. It was the first and only premiership won by West Melbourne during its nine-season stint in the VFA.

Premiership 
The home-and-away season was played over eighteen rounds, with each club playing the others twice; then, the top four clubs contested a finals series under the amended Argus system to determine the premiers for the season.

Ladder

Finals

Notable events 
 Boundary umpires were introduced for Association matches for the first time in 1906.

Interleague matches 

The VFA's second match against the S.A.F.A. was originally scheduled to be played on an otherwise vacant day in the Melbourne football calendar, with a bye week in both the League and Association, and the V.F.L. team playing in Ballarat. However, the VFL made a change by shifting two of its 4 August matches onto 11 August, much to the VFA's chagrin, severely affecting the crowd at the game.

External links 
 Victorian Football Association/Victorian Football League History (1877-2008)
 List of VFA/VFL Premiers (1877–2007)

References 

Victorian Football League seasons
VFL